Akluj Fort  is a fort located 115 km from Solapur, in Solapur district, of Maharashtra. This fort is an important fort in Solapur district. The fort restoration is done by the Shree Dinkarrao Thopte and Avinash Thopte with the help of local people. The fort is now also called Shivshrushti.

History
The history is mentioned under the Akluj Town. Sambhaji Maharaj along with 26 others was captured by Mukarrab Khan from Sangameshwar and brought to this fort

How to reach
The nearest town is Solapur.  The Fort is open to the public from 10 am to 6 pm. It is located on the banks of the river Nira.
Nearest Airport is Pune at 170 Km (Approx)

Places to see
Inside the fort are various idols made from fibre depicting life of Shivaji Maharaj.  It takes about an hour to visit all places on the fort. This is one of the well maintained fort in Maharashtra.

See also 

 List of forts in Maharashtra
 List of forts in India
 Sambhaji Maharaj
 Marathi People
 List of Maratha dynasties and states
 Maratha War of Independence
 Maratha Army
 Maratha titles
 Military history of India
 List of people involved in the Maratha Empire
 Akluj

References 

Buildings and structures of the Maratha Empire
16th-century forts in India
Forts in Maharashtra